Margaret Northrop (born 16 April 1934) is a Kenyan former swimmer. She competed in the women's 100 metre freestyle at the 1956 Summer Olympics. She was the first woman to represent Kenya at the Olympics.

References

1934 births
Living people
Kenyan female swimmers
Olympic swimmers of Kenya
Swimmers at the 1956 Summer Olympics
Place of birth missing (living people)
Kenyan female freestyle swimmers